Bukit Brown MRT station is a future underground Mass Rapid Transit (MRT) station on the Circle line (CCL), located in Novena planning area, Singapore. Announced along with the 17 stations of CCL Stages 4 and 5 in November 2005, it was designated as a station to be opened in the future. This station is currently non-operational due to the lack of development and demand in the area, although there are structural provisions set for the station future construction. Jalan Mashhor serves the station facilities on the ground level.

History
The station is named after the former Bukit Brown Cemetery, which it is situated in. Named after George Henry Brown, the first owner of the land, the cemetery was used as a Chinese burial ground between 1922 and 1973. When Stages 4 and 5 of the Circle Line were announced in November 2005, Bukit Brown was one of the three 'shell' stations on the line set to be constructed in the future when there is sufficient demand in the area. Structural provisions were made during the construction of the CCL to facilitate the construction of the future station.

Station details
The station, when constructed, will be between Caldecott and Botanic Gardens stations. The station is located along Jalan Mashhor.

Notes

References

External links

Toa Payoh
Proposed railway stations in Singapore
Mass Rapid Transit (Singapore) stations